Sandy Salmon is an American politician, military veteran, and farm manager. Salmon is a Republican member of the Iowa Senate from District 29 and previously served on the Iowa House of Representatives as the Representative from District 63 from 2013-2023.

Early life 
On October 23, 1955, Salmon was born in Oklahoma. Salmon's father was Dwight Puttmann, who served in the U.S. military and stationed at Army base in Fort Sill in Lawton, Oklahoma. Salmon's mother was Sally Puttmann. Salmon has a sister. They have a family farm in northwest Iowa. In 1973, Salmon graduated from Kinsley-Pierson High School.

Education 
In 1977, Salmon earned a bachelor's degree in Business Management from University of Northern Iowa.

Career 
In 1977, Salmon served in the United States Marine Corps, until 1980.

As a home educator, Salmon provided K-12 education to her children.

In 2011, Salmon became a legislative clerk in the Iowa State Senate.

On November 6, 2012, Salmon's political career began when she won the election and became a member of the Iowa House of Representatives for District 63. Salmon defeated Bill Heckroth with 50.3% of the votes. On November 4, 2014, as an incumbent, Salmon won the election and continued serving as a member of Iowa House of Representatives for District 63. Salmon defeated Teresa Meyer with 58.1% of the votes. On November 8, 2016, as an incumbent, Salmon won the election and continued serving District 63. Salmon defeated Teresa Meyer again.  On November 6, 2018, as an incumbent, Salmon won the election and continued serving District 63. Salmon defeated Eric Stromberg.

Salmon serves as the chairperson of the Veterans Affairs Committee. Salmon also serves as a member of Education Committee, Human Resources Committee, and Public Safety Committee.

Salmon manages a farm with her sister.

Electoral history 
*incumbent

Personal life 
Salmon's husband is Matt Salmon, a helicopter pilot and a retired Army National Guard. They have three children. They received their home-schooled education K-12. Salmon and her family live in Janesville, Iowa.

References

External links 
Sandy Salmon's Official Website 
Representative Sandy Salmon at legis.iowa.gov
 Iowa bill 377 at wcfcourier.com
 Sandy Salmon at Submariners Memorial Highway ceremony

Female United States Marine Corps personnel
Republican Party members of the Iowa House of Representatives
Military personnel from Iowa
Living people
People from Bremer County, Iowa
Women state legislators in Iowa
People from Janesville, Iowa
1955 births
21st-century American politicians
21st-century American women politicians